Whitefin may refer to:

Animals
Whitefin chimaera
Whitefin dogfish
Whitefin dolphin
Whitefin hammerhead
Whitefin shark
Whitefin sharksucker
Whitefin shiner
Whitefin surgeonfish
Whitefin swellshark
Whitefin topeshark
Whitefin trevally

Other uses
Whitefin (yacht), a sailing super yacht

See also